Girl is a 1998 American drama film starring Dominique Swain, Christopher Masterson, Selma Blair, Tara Reid, Summer Phoenix, Portia de Rossi and Sean Patrick Flanery. It was based on the novel of the same name, written by Blake Nelson. It was written by Blake Nelson and David E. Tolchinsky and directed by Jonathan Kahn.

Plot
Andrea Marr (Dominique Swain) is a bright, straight-A, 18-year-old high school senior living a sheltered life in rural Washington. She has 2 close friends, bookish Darcy (Selma Blair) and rebellious, aspiring rock star Cybil (Tara Reid). Andrea is insecure and confused at her budding sexuality.

In pursuit of becoming "women", Andrea and Darcy attend a frat party in attempts to lose their virginity. Both are unsuccessful, and Andrea ends up passing out and waking up with a frat boy masturbating on top of her. Upon learning of her acceptance to Brown University, Andrea realizes that she hasn't had many life experiences. So she ventures into the local rock scene with classmate and groupie Rebecca (Summer Phoenix) to watch Cybil and her band, which is made up of two other classmates Richard (Christopher Masterson) and Greg (David Moscow). There, she meets local rock singer Todd Sparrow (Sean Patrick Flanery) and becomes enamored with him. Andrea loses her virginity to a guy named Kevin (Channon Roe) whom she also met at the show, but found the experience disappointing. Later, she finds Todd at a record store and accompanies him back to his sister Carla's (Portia De Rossi) apartment where they have sex. After, Todd leaves abruptly to go to band practice, leaving Andrea upset, but also obsessed with him. Andrea begins to neglect her friends, particularly Darcy, who is suffering from an eating disorder, in her pursuit of Todd.

In the meantime, Cybil reveals to Andrea that she's dropping out of high school because she got a record deal. However, the record deal was only offered to her and not to Richard and Greg. Richard is upset, but ultimately accepting of it, whereas Greg becomes severely depressed. Cybil and her new band open for Todd's band, and Andrea goes to the show. At the show, Andrea and Todd reunite and Andrea becomes Todd's groupie, and they get together often to have sex. Todd eventually breaks things off to go on tour, leaving Andrea heartbroken.

Graduation comes along, and Andrea is very somber. Unbeknownst to her, Todd came to the ceremony and watches her from the parking lot before driving off. Andrea finds a crying Richard at graduation and learns that Greg died by suicide. Andrea goes to the class graduation party. At the party, Andrea goes upstairs and finds Darcy making herself throw up in the bathroom. Andrea apologizes to Darcy about neglecting her and makes her promise to seek treatment for her eating disorder which Darcy agrees to. Darcy reveals that she was very jealous of Andrea because she appeared to have everything. Andrea helps Darcy clean up. When they leave the bathroom, Andrea and Darcy get accosted by a classmate who often used to bully Richard and Greg. Richard intervenes, reveals his longtime crush on Darcy, and asks her to dance, which Darcy agrees. Andrea watches Darcy and Richard dance, then gets approached by Cybil, who showed up to the party. Cybil expresses regret and sadness over Greg's suicide and says that she feels responsible. Andrea consoles her, and Cybil reveals her feelings for Andrea by kissing her on the lips. Andrea is surprised, and even though she doesn't reciprocate those feelings, she allows Cybil to kiss her anyway. Andrea leaves the party.

After the party, Andrea walks around for a while thinking about everything that's happened and encounters Todd. They go back to his apartment to talk, and Todd opens up to Andrea. He apologizes for treating her so badly and tells her that he can't go on tour without her and that he needs her. Andrea reveals to him that she's going to Brown in the fall and Todd is surprised at how smart she actually is. They attempt to have sex, but they can't because Todd is unable to get an erection. Andrea leaves, breaking things off with Todd for good.

Andrea leaves for college, declaring herself a woman, and hopeful for her future.

Cast
 Dominique Swain as Andrea Marr 
 Sean Patrick Flanery as Todd Sparrow 
 Summer Phoenix as Rebecca Fernhurst 
 Tara Reid as Cybil 
 Selma Blair as Darcy 
 Channon Roe as Kevin 
 Portia de Rossi as Carla Sparrow  
 Christopher Masterson as Richard
 David Moscow as Greg

External links

1998 films
1998 romantic drama films
American coming-of-age drama films
American romantic drama films
American teen romance films
Films about virginity
Films scored by Michael Tavera
Films based on American novels
Films set in Washington (state)
Films shot in Los Angeles
1990s English-language films
1990s American films